The Northwest International League was a minor league baseball league that played briefly in the 1919 season. The four–team Class B level league evolved from the 1918 Pacific Coast International League, with franchises based in Washington and British Columbia.

History
In 1919, the Pacific Coast International League, which was formerly the Northwestern League, changed its name to become the "Northwest International League" for the 1919 season, before reverting back to the Pacific Coast International League name for the 1920 season. J. M. Osmond served as president of the 1919 Northwest International League.

Beginning play on April 23, 1919, the Northwest International League consisted of two Washington–based teams and two Canada–based teams. The Seattle Giants, Tacoma Tigers, Vancouver Beavers and Victoria Tyrees were the league members. 

On June 5, 1919, the Tacoma Tigers franchise folded, leaving the league with three remaining teams. On June 8, 1919, the league disbanded. The Vancouver Beavers finished in 1st place with a 20-14 record, ending the season 1.0 game ahead of 2nd place Seattle (16–12) and 2.0 games ahead of 3rd place Victoria (14–12). The Tacoma Tigers finished in last place with a 5–17 record.

The Pacific Coast International league reformed for the 1920 season.

Cities represented 
 Seattle, WA: Seattle Giants 1919 
 Tacoma, WA: Tacoma Tigers 1919 
 Vancouver, BC: Vancouver Beavers 1919 
 Victoria, BC: Victoria Tyees 1919

Standings & statistics 
 1919 Northwest International League
schedule
 Tacoma disbanded June 5, causing the league to disband June 8.

References

External links
Baseball Reference

Sports leagues established in 1919
Baseball leagues in Washington (state)
Defunct minor baseball leagues in the United States
Defunct baseball leagues in Canada
Sports leagues disestablished in 1919